Anjana Rana Magar (Nepali: अन्जना राना मगर ; born 17 January 2002) is a Nepali footballer who plays as a goalkeeper for Tribhuvan Army Football Club and Nepal women's national football team.

See also
Football in Nepal

References

2002 births
Living people
People from Saptari District
Nepalese women's footballers
Women's association football goalkeepers